A Good Man is an 2020 French-Belgian drama film, directed and produced by Marie-Castille Mention-Schaar, from a screenplay by Mention-Schaar and Christian Sondregger. It stars Noémie Merlant, Soko, Vincent Dedienne, Gabriel Almaer, Alysson Paradis, Anne Loiret,  Geneviève Mnich and Jonas Ben Ahmed.

The film was selected to screen at the 2020 Cannes Film Festival, prior to its cancellation due to the COVID-19 pandemic. It had its world premiere at the Deauville Film Festival on 6 September 2020. It was released on 3 March 2021, by Pyramide Distribution.

Plot
Benjamin and Aude want to have a baby, but when they discover Aude is unable to conceive Benjamin comes up with a plan.

Cast
 Noémie Merlant as Benjamin
 Soko as Aude
 Vincent Dedienne as Antonie
 Gabriel Almaer as Erwann
 Alysson Paradis as Annette
 Anne Loiret as Eva
 Geneviève Mnich as Jeannette
 Jonas Ben Ahmed as Neil

Release
The film was set to have its world premiere at the Cannes Film Festival in May 2020, prior to its cancellation. It had its world premiere at the Deauville Film Festival on 6 September 2020. It was released on 3 March 2021.

References

External links
 

2020 films
French drama films
Belgian drama films
French LGBT-related films
Belgian LGBT-related films
Films about trans men
Films postponed due to the COVID-19 pandemic
2020 LGBT-related films
2020s French-language films
French-language Belgian films
Films directed by Marie-Castille Mention-Schaar
2020s French films